American singer and actress Selena Gomez has received many awards and nominations throughout her career. She rose to prominence for her lead role as Alex Russo on the Disney Channel television series Wizards of Waverly Place (2007–2012), which garnered her the ALMA Award and two times the Teen Choice Award for Best Comedy TV Actress, while nominated for three NAACP Image Awards. She also won the Kids' Choice Award for Favorite TV Actress five times in a row. She currently holds the record for the most Kids' Choice Awards wins (12) for an individual. Gomez's acting credits include her main roles in the films Another Cinderella Story (2008), which earned her a Young Artist Award, Spring Breakers (2012), and her voice acting role in the Hotel Transylvania film franchise (2012–2022), for which she won a People's Choice Award, and was nominated for a Children's and Family Emmy Award. 

Gomez's debut solo album, Stars Dance, was released in 2013, and spawned the MTV Video Music Award for Best Pop Video-winning "Come & Get It". In 2015, she released her second studio album, Revival, and was awarded the Chart-Topper Award at the Billboard Women in Music event. The following year, she won the iHeartRadio Music Award for Biggest Triple Threat and was nominated for two Billboard Music Awards, including Top Female Artist. She also won the American Music Award for Favorite Pop/Rock Female Artist and was nominated for Artist of the Year. In 2017, Gomez was named Billboards Woman of the Year. That year, she released the single "It Ain't Me", which received nominations at major awards around the world, including the Billboard Music Award for Top Dance/Electronic Song. The song "Taki Taki" received two nominations at the 2019 Billboard Music Awards, including Top Latin Song, and won Song of the Year at the Latin American Music Awards. In 2020, Gomez released her third studio album, Rare, and was honored later that year by The Latin Recording Academy as one of the Leading Ladies of Entertainment. She was also listed as one of 100 most influential people by Time magazine.

Revelación (2021), her first Spanish-language EP, was nominated for Best Latin Pop Album at the 64th Annual Grammy Awards, and received Latin Pop Album of the Year nominations from the Billboard Latin Music, Latin American Music and Lo Nuestro award ceremonies. The lead single, "De Una Vez", was nominated for a Latin Grammy Award. Gomez received critical praise for her performance in the Hulu mystery-comedy series Only Murders in the Building (2021–present), which garnered her the Satellite Award for Best Actress – Television Series Musical or Comedy and a Hollywood Critics Association TV Award, while nominated for the Critics' Choice Television Award and the Golden Globe Award for Best Actress in a Comedy Series. She won two times the People's Choice Award for Comedy TV Star of the Year and was nominated two times for the Screen Actors Guild Award for Outstanding Performance by an Ensemble in a Comedy Series. She was also nominated as producer for the Primetime Emmy Award for Outstanding Comedy Series. For her work on Coldplay's studio album, Music of the Spheres, as featured artist on "Let Somebody Go", she was nominated for Album of the Year at the 65th Annual Grammy Awards.

In addition, Gomez has earned several accolades for her philanthropic efforts and mental health advocacy work; she was honored with the McLean Award in 2019, and received the Mentee Award by the Stanford Healthcare Innovation Lab and the Morton E. Ruderman Award in Inclusion in 2022. Gomez has also broken 16 Guinness World Records thus far.

Awards and nominations

Other accolades

World records

Listicles

See also
Selena Gomez & the Scene awards and nominations
List of awards and nominations received by Wizards of Waverly Place

Notes

References

External links
 
 

Awards
Gomez, Selena
Gomez, Selena